Warm Springs Reservoir is a reservoir on the boundary between Harney and Malheur counties in the U.S. state of Oregon. The lake's primary inflow and outflow are both the Malheur River.

As of the 2000 Census, there were 157 people living within the watershed's boundaries.

The predominant wildlife in the region is mule deer and various waterfowl. Bass, bluegill, and rainbow trout are the main fish found in the reservoir.

See also
List of lakes in Oregon

References

External links

Reservoirs in Oregon
Lakes of Harney County, Oregon
Lakes of Malheur County, Oregon
Buildings and structures in Harney County, Oregon
Buildings and structures in Malheur County, Oregon
Protected areas of Harney County, Oregon
Protected areas of Malheur County, Oregon
Dams in Oregon
United States Bureau of Reclamation dams
Dams completed in 1919
1919 establishments in Oregon